Christine Young is an American investigative journalist and author of the book A Bitter Brew: Faith, Power and Poison in a Small New England Town, which documented the largest case of criminal  arsenic poisoning in American history.

Early years and education
Young was born in Jamaica, New York. When she was seven, her father became an FBI agent and was eventually transferred to FBI headquarters in Washington, DC. Young grew up in Springfield, Virginia, graduating from West Springfield High School. In 1995 she received a BA in Arts & Humanities from the University of Southern Maine and in 2009 received a Knight-Bagehot Fellowship in Economics and Business Journalism from Columbia University, earning a Master of Science degree. She holds a Bachelor of Arts degree from the  University of Southern Maine.

Career
The daughter of an FBI agent and a registered nurse, Young began her career at WMTW, the  ABC affiliate in  Portland, Maine, where her reporting, profiled on A&E's Cold Case Files and TruTV's Forensic Files, led police to the remains of Pearl Bruns, a South Portland grandmother who was found buried in the basement of her home after she was beaten to death by her husband.

In 1996, Young led the first television camera crew into the world's largest brown egg production facility, Decoster Eggs, where she documented dangerous and inhumane conditions for migrant workers. Later, Young's reporting exposed financial skullduggery and illegal election practices of the Christian Civic League of Maine, a conservative lobbying group responsible for overturning Maine's gay rights law.

Young's 2005 book,  A Bitter Brew: Faith, Power and Poison in a Small New England Town, documented a 2003 arsenic poisoning that took place at a small  Lutheran church in  New Sweden, Maine, killing one church member and making 15 others critically ill. While  Maine State Police and many church members theorized that someone had helped the poisoner, lifelong member Daniel Bondeson, Young's book rejected the conspiracy theory, revealing that Bondeson, who shot himself at his family farm five days after the poisoning, left a note taking sole responsibility for the crime.  In 2006, the  Maine Attorney General agreed that Bondeson had acted alone and closed the case.

In 2006,  Young began investigating the facts behind the 1987 Hell's Kitchen murder of a young prostitute from Buffalo, New York, Michaelanne Hall, and the conviction of an intellectually challenged security guard, Lebrew Jones. Suspecting Jones had been wrongfully convicted, Young convinced the New York County District Attorney's Office to reopen the case, and Jones was freed from prison in 2009.

In December, 2009, Young's series of multimedia stories on the Jones case was highlighted in testimony before the Federal Trade Commission  by Karen Dunlap, president of the journalism think tank Poytner Institute.  Jones, the son of Count Basie and Duke Ellington jazz drummer Rufus "Speedy" Jones, served 22 years in prison before winning an early release that legal experts attributed to Young's work.

Young is currently working on a book chronicling how public demands for “justice,” shoddy police investigations and systemic judicial bias too often rob innocent people of their liberty and deprive crime victims of authentic justice.

Awards and honors

Young is the recipient of the Alfred I. duPont-Columbia University Award Silver Baton, the National Headliner Award for Investigative Reporting, the Clarion Award for Investigative Reporting, and an RTNDA Edward R. Murrow Award for investigative reporting. She has also received the New York Newspaper Publishers Association's Distinguished Investigative Reporting Award, the New York Associated Press Writing Contest, the New York Associated Press Award for Beat Reporting, the Society of Professional Journalists Sigma Delta Chi Award for Investigative Reporting, the 2008 Online News Association's Online Journalism Award, and the 2009 Excellence in Criminal Justice Reporting Award from  John Jay College of Criminal Justice.

References 

Living people
American women journalists
University of Southern Maine alumni
Columbia University Graduate School of Journalism alumni
Writers from Maine
Year of birth missing (living people)
21st-century American women